Postolin may refer to the following places in Poland:
Postolin, Lower Silesian Voivodeship (south-west Poland)
Postolin, Pomeranian Voivodeship (north Poland)